Tapio Luusua (born in Pelkosenniemi on August 4, 1981) is a Finnish freestyle skier. At the FIS Freestyle World Ski Championships 2009 he received a silver medal in moguls and a bronze in dual moguls. He also competed in the 2002 Winter Olympics and competed for Finland at the 2010 Winter Olympics.

References 

Finnish male freestyle skiers
Freestyle skiers at the 2002 Winter Olympics
Freestyle skiers at the 2010 Winter Olympics
Olympic freestyle skiers of Finland
People from Pelkosenniemi
1981 births
Living people
Sportspeople from Lapland (Finland)